Matt Reid and John-Patrick Smith were the defending champions but chose not to defend their title.

Christopher Eubanks and Kevin King won the title after defeating Evan Hoyt and Martin Redlicki 7–5, 6–3 in the final.

Seeds

Draw

References

External links
 Main draw

JSM Challenger of Champaign-Urbana - Doubles
2019 Doubles